Tatyana Kozlova (born 2 September 1983 in Saransk) is a Russian race walker.

Achievements

External links 

1983 births
Living people
Russian female racewalkers
People from Saransk
Sportspeople from Mordovia
21st-century Russian women